Saurita clandestina is a moth in the subfamily Arctiinae. It was described by Zerny in 1912. It is found in Brazil (Rio de Janeiro).

References

Natural History Museum Lepidoptera generic names catalog

Moths described in 1912
Saurita